The play-offs of the 2019 Fed Cup Europe/Africa Zone Group I were the final stages of the Group I zonal competition involving teams from Europe and Africa. Using the positions determined in their pools, the fourteen teams faced off to determine their placing in the 2019 Fed Cup Europe/Africa Zone Group I. The top two teams advanced to World Group II Play-offs, and the bottom two teams were relegated to the Europe/Africa Zone Group II.

Pool results

Promotional play-offs 
The first placed teams of each pool were drawn in head-to-head rounds. The winner of each round advanced to the World Group II Play-offs.

Russia vs. Sweden

Great Britain vs. Serbia

5th place play-off
The runner-up teams from pools A and B (in both venues) competed in order to establish which two teams would place joint fifth in the final standings and which two would place joint seventh.

Poland vs. Ukraine

Hungary vs. Croatia

9th place play-off
The third placed teams from pools A and B in Bath competed in order to establish which team would place ninth in the final standings (alongside Bulgaria) and which team would place eleventh.

Greece vs. Turkey

Relegation play-offs 
The teams placing last in each pool competed to keep their place in the Europe/Africa Zone Group I. The losers were relegated to the 2020 Europe/Africa Zone Group II.

Denmark vs. Estonia

Slovenia vs. Georgia

Final placements 

References

External links 
 Fed Cup website

2019 Fed Cup Europe/Africa Zone
Fed Cup